Andrew John "W.I.Z." Whiston (born 4 January 1964) is an English director of films and music videos.

Career
W.I.Z. has directed a number of high-concept videos for major music artists from the United Kingdom and the United States, including Massive Attack, Kasabian, Oasis, and Marilyn Manson. Many of these videos, in addition to featuring the song and the performers, also follow a running narrative, and may contain a political or social message. Once in a band himself, W.I.Z. has also directed concert films of live performances by the bands Suede, Manic Street Preachers and Primal Scream.

He has directed two short films: Weekender and Baby. The 1992 film Weekender follows the band Flowered Up and displays the hedonistic side of club and drug culture; the 13-minute film was screened on Channel 4 in Britain.

W.I.Z.'s second short film Baby made its European debut at the 2000 Edinburgh International film festival and its U.S. debut at the MVPA Director's Cuts 2000 film festival. In February 2003, W.I.Z.'s video for Black Rebel Motorcycle Club's "Whatever Happened to My Rock 'N Roll" was named as MTV2 Europe's "Best Video of the Year 2002" by the NME Carling Awards.

As of 2012 he was signed to the production company My Accomplice. He previously worked with Academy Films, Factory Films and Oil Factory Inc.

Selected videography

2019
 MIKA – "Sanremo"
 MIKA – "Tiny Love"

2017
 Kasabian – "You're in Love with a Psycho"
 Kasabian – "Bless This Acid House"

2013
 Disclosure – "Voices"
 Kings of Leon – "Supersoaker"

2012
 Ellie Goulding – "Figure 8"
 Emeli Sandé – "Clown"
 Robbie Williams – "Different"
 Dark Horses – "Strait Street" 

2010
 Magnetic Man feat. Katy B – "Perfect Stranger"
 Hurts – "Better Than Love", "Sunday"

2009
 Dizzee Rascal – "Dirtee Cash"
 Oasis – "Falling Down"
 Kasabian – "Fire", "Vlad the Impaler"

2008
 Oasis – "I'm Outta Time"

2007
 Clinic – "Tomorrow"
 Dizzee Rascal – "Sirens"
 Kaiser Chiefs – "The Angry Mob"

2006
 All Saints – "Rock Steady"
 Arctic Monkeys – "The View from the Afternoon"
 Kasabian – "Empire"

2005
 Will Young – "All Time Love"

2004
 The 411 – "Teardrops"
 Jamelia – "See It in a Boy's Eyes"
 Kasabian – "Club Foot", "L.S.F."

2003
 Stereophonics – "Maybe Tomorrow"
 Dirty Harry – "So Real"
 Cradle of Filth – "Babalon A.D. (So Glad for the Madness)"

2002
 Black Rebel Motorcycle Club – "Whatever Happened to My Rock 'N Roll", "We're All in Love"
 Oasis – "Stop Crying Your Heart Out", "The Hindu Times"
 Shakira – "Te Dejo Madrid"

2001
 Marilyn Manson – "The Fight Song"
 Zero 7 – "In the Waiting Line"

2000
 The Smashing Pumpkins – "Stand Inside Your Love"
 Primal Scream – "Accelerator"

1999
 The Chemical Brothers – "Out of Control"
 Leftfield – "Dusted"
 Melanie B – "Word Up"

1998
 All Saints – "War of Nerves"
 DJ Rap – "Bad Girl"
 Ian Brown – "My Star"
 Manic Street Preachers – "If You Tolerate This Your Children Will Be Next"
 Massive Attack – "Inertia Creeps"

1997
 Marilyn Manson – "Man That You Fear"
 Suede – "He's Dead"

1996
 Manic Street Preachers – "Everything Must Go"

1995
 Del Amitri – "Here and Now"
 Simple Minds – "Hypnotised"
 Therapy? – "Loose", "Diane"

1994
 The Black Crowes – "A Conspiracy"
 Brand New Heavies – "Back to Love"
 The Charlatans – "Jesus Hairdo"
 Deee-Lite – "Picnic in the Summertime"

1993
 Jamiroquai – "Too Young to Die , "Emergency on Planet Earth"
 Suede –  Love and Poison (concert video), "Metal Mickey", "She's Not Dead"

1992
 Flowered Up – "Weekender"
 Happy Mondays – "Stinkin' Thinkin'"

1991
 Manic Street Preachers – "You Love Us", "Love's Sweet Exile"

1990
 Bocca Juniors – "Raise (53 Steps to Heaven)"

References

External links
 
 
 W.I.Z. at the Internet Music Video Database

Living people
1964 births
People from Stoke-on-Trent
English music video directors